Louis Joseph Thomas (born January 16, 1942) is an American educator and administrator who is the Anne and Elmer Lindseth Dean Emeritus and professor of operations management of the Samuel Curtis Johnson Graduate School of Management at Cornell University. He served Johnson as its dean for five years, prior to returning to the faculty in 2012.

References 

Carnegie Mellon University alumni
Cornell University faculty
Yale University alumni
Living people
1942 births
Johnson School faculty
Business school deans
People from Barnesville, Ohio